Major General Jan Robert Andreas Andersson (born 22 July 1955) is a retired Swedish Air Force officer. He served as Inspector of the Air Force from 2003 to 2008.

Early life
Andersson was born in Västervik, Sweden. He served in the Army Ranger School in Kiruna, Lapland and 19-years-old, on his way home from Kiruna, Andersson flew for the first time. He studied to become an engineer but dropped out and enrolled at the Swedish Air Force Flying School in Ljungbyhed.

Career
After graduating, Andersson was commissioned as an officer and was assigned to Norrbotten Wing (F 21). In the mid-1980s he was recruited to Linjeflyg as a commercial pilot but decided to stay in the air force. He underwent the management course at the Swedish National Defence College from 1987 to 1989. He flew Saab JAS 39 Gripen for the first time on 23 June 1993. He was then chief of tactical evaluation of the Saab JAS 39 Gripen. Andersson was commanding officer of the Skaraborg Wing (F 7) from 1998 to 2001. He was then promoted to brigadier general and was appointed chief of staff and Deputy Chief of the Air Force Command in Uppsala as well as Deputy Inspector General of the Air Force on 1 April 2001.

Andersson took office as Inspector of the Air Force in the Swedish Armed Forces Headquarters on 1 January 2003. He was at the same time promoted to major general. Andersson served in this position until 2008 when he was succeeded by Anders Silwer and appointed military attaché in Washington, D.C. He retired from the Swedish Armed Forces in 2011 and then hold a position as Senior Military Advisor at the Swedish Defence and Security Export Agency (Försvarsexportmyndigheten).

Honours
Member of the Royal Swedish Academy of War Sciences (1999)
Chairman of Section III, Air Warfare Studies, of the Royal Swedish Academy of War Sciences (2014)

Personal life
Andersson is married to Gunilla, a teacher, and they have two children.

Dates of rank
1998 – Colonel
1 April 2001 – Brigadier general
1 January 2003 – Major general

References

1955 births
Living people
Swedish Air Force major generals
People from Västervik Municipality
Swedish air attachés
Members of the Royal Swedish Academy of War Sciences